The 1903 Copa del Rey Final was the first final of the Copa del Rey, the Spanish football cup competition. The match took place on 8 April 1903 at the Hipódromo, Madrid. The match was contested by Athletic Bilbao and Madrid FC.

Madrid FC scored twice in the first half to lead the match 0–2 down at the break. However, a crucial harangue at the break by the Athletic Bilbao captain and president Juan Astorquia, inspired Athletic to pull off a great emotional comeback in the second half that turned the game around, thus lifting the trophy for the first time with a 3–2 victory. Athletic Bilbao claims this trophy to be their second in a row, although the Royal Spanish Football Federation doesn't recognize the previous tournament as official. Six Athletic players who played in this final had been proclaimed champions of the Coronation Cup in the previous year with Club Bizcaya.

This match has been identified as a catalyst for the establishment a few weeks later of what would eventually become Club Atlético de Madrid, after some Madrid-based Basque students among the spectators were inspired by the comeback victory by Athletic Bilbao and decided to form a local branch of the club.

Summary 
In front of 5,000 expectant spectators, it was a Madrid FC side captained by Guatemala Federico Revuelto who came out stronger in the first half, developing a brilliant game that was converted in a 2–0 lead at the break, with Marqués de Valdeterrazo opening the scoring in the 15th minute, while Antonio Neyra doubled their advantage just before the break.

Madrid FC decided to go defensive in the second half, feeling they could hold a 2–0 lead against a demoralized Athletic Bilbao team, but instead, they found an Athletic side even more driven than before, largely thanks to a crucial harangue at the break by their captain and president Juan Astorquia. Madrid was able to resist Athletic's relentless siege for only 10 minutes, as the Basque club found a goal when Raymond Cazeaux scored in the 55th minute. The Athletic attack kept colliding again and again with the Madrid defense, and despite some fine saves from goalkeeper Arthur Johnson, and great defensive work from the Giralt brothers (Mario, Armando and José), the people from Bilbao managed to find the equalizer with 20 minutes to go thanks to Eduardo Montejo. Athletic did not let go of the siege and pressed for a winner, which they found in the 80th minute when Alejandro de la Sota scored the goal that sent the people from Bilbao into euphoria. The result remained unchanged until the final whistle, and Athletic Bilbao was proclaimed as the first official champion of Spain.

Match details 

|}

See also
El Viejo Clásico

References

External links
RSSSF.com

1903
1902–03 in Spanish football
Athletic Bilbao matches
Real Madrid CF matches